Mączka or Maczka is a surname of Polish-language origin, derived from mączka. Notable people with the surname include:
 Dominika Mączka, Polish track cyclist
 Józef Mączka (1888–1918), Polish soldier and poet
 Laura Maczka, American politician
 Sister Melanie Maczka (born 1943)

See also
 

Polish-language surnames